Calveriosoma is a genus of echinoderms belonging to the family Echinothuriidae.

The genus has almost cosmopolitan distribution.

Species:

Calveriosoma gracile 
Calveriosoma hystrix

References

Echinothuriidae
Echinoidea genera